The Visitation is the fourth serial of the 19th season of the British science fiction television series Doctor Who, which was first broadcast in four twice-weekly parts on BBC1 from 15 to 23 February 1982.

The serial is set in and near London in the 17th century. In the serial, a group of fugitive aliens called Terileptils plot to make the Earth their new home by spreading a deadly plague among humanity.

Plot
The TARDIS lands in 17th-century London. Upon stepping outside, The Doctor, Nyssa, Tegan, and Adric immediately smell sulphur and head off to find the source. Richard Mace, a highwayman and self-proclaimed thespian, encounters the group and takes them to safety inside a barn. While questioning Mace, they find out that some kind of comet recently landed nearby.

The Doctor and his friends discover the "comet" was actually a spaceship inhabited by a Terileptil fugitive, who uses mind controlling bracelets to subdue the local villagers. In a nearby manor house, they find a cellar full of caged rats and a device emitting soliton gas. The Terileptil plan to use rats infected with a genetically enhanced plague to devastate the population and conquer the planet.

Using the TARDIS scanner, the Doctor locates the Terileptil in London. The TARDIS rematerialises there and the five enter the building. With the Terileptil leader are two others who get the jump on the Doctor and Mace. They manage to stop them, but the Terileptil leader's weapon starts to overload and detonates. The resulting explosion destroys the building and starts a raging fire. Mace stays behind to fight the blaze as the Doctor, Tegan, Nyssa and Adric leave in the TARDIS.

It is revealed that the fire is at Pudding Lane, the location where the Great Fire of London started.

Broadcast and reception

The story was repeated on BBC1 across four consecutive evenings from 15–18 August 1983, achieving viewing figures of 4.3, 4.6, 3.6 and 4.8 million viewers, respectively.

At the time of original broadcast, the series as a whole was getting watched in 39 countries worldwide, with around 88 million viewers abroad and an average of 10 million in the domestic market.

Paul Cornell, Martin Day and Keith Topping gave a favourable review of the serial in The Discontinuity Guide (1995), writing, "A good, hearty action romp, crisply written and engaging, although critics might say that it's too straight-forward. There's only one proper character (Richard Mace), which gives Peter Davison and Michael Robbins the space to turn in a pair of lovely performances. The end result is a stylish slice of pseudo-historical nonsense." In The Television Companion (1998), David J. Howe and Stephen James Walker called The Visitation "a very enjoyable story, and one of the highlights of the season". They praised the location filming, but noted a weakness was "Matthew Waterhouse's peculiar performance as Adric". In 2012, Patrick Mulkern of Radio Times awarded it four stars out of five. He said that the story was "pedestrian in places, [but] Saward does execute one or two dramatic flourishes". He said that Davison was growing into the role and the companions were given something to do despite being "variable", and was mixed towards the design of the Terileptils. Reviewing the special-edition DVD release for SFX, Nick Setchfield gave The Visitation three-and-a-half out of five stars. He noted that it was a "throwback" and "built on capture-escape-capture storytelling, but it's brimful of oaky, shadowy 17th-century atmosphere".

Peter Davison stated that The Visitation is one of his three favourite serials from his time on the programme.

Commercial releases

In print

A novelisation of this serial, written by Eric Saward, was published by Target Books in August 1982. Its cover was originally to be painted like the other Target Doctor Who novels, but an objection by Peter Davison's agent resulted in a photographic cover being used instead. This was the only Peter Davison story to have its novelisation titled as Doctor Who and the... in its original edition. An unabridged recording of the Target novelisation was released in 2012, read by Matthew Waterhouse.

A behind-the-scenes book following the production process of the story was printed by Andre Deutsch Limited in 1982, with text by Alan Road and illustrations by Richard Farley.

Home media
The Visitation was released on a VHS double pack with Black Orchid in July 1994. It was released on DVD-Video in the United Kingdom on 19 January 2004, and used material from the 16 mm film prints, which still exist in the BBC Archives. A special edition of the story with additional features was released on DVD on 6 May 2013.

The serial was released on blu-ray in December 2018 as part of "The Collection - Season 19" box set.

Soundtrack

The February 2020 issue of Doctor Who Magazine announced that Paddy Kingsland's score for this serial will be released on CD and vinyl.  Release date and track listing were announced on 1 May 2020

Track listing

References

External links

Target novelisation

On Target – The Visitation

Fifth Doctor serials
Doctor Who pseudohistorical serials
Doctor Who serials novelised by Eric Saward
1982 British television episodes
Fiction set in the 1660s
Television episodes set in London
Great Fire of London
Television episodes set in the 17th century